Strabomantis is a genus of frogs in the family Strabomantidae. At times these frogs have been included in the large genus Eleutherodactylus. They are distributed from Costa Rica southwards to northern South America.

Species 
There are 16 species in this genus:

References

 
Amphibian genera
Amphibians of South America
Amphibians of Central America
Taxa named by Wilhelm Peters